Bryce Retzlaff was a professional Australian rules football player at the Brisbane Lions. He was taken at pick No. 84 in the 2010 National Draft, after having played for Labrador in the QAFL. Retzlaff made his debut in QClash 1, the inaugural Queensland derby, against .

After sustaining an ACL injury in 2012, Bryce was delisted from the Brisbane Lions. In 2013, he made his come back to football at the Box Hill Hawks Football Club becoming a premiership player after a VFL grand final win against Geelong. Retzlaff then went on to sign with Central District Football Club as a key forward in both 2014 and 2015.

In 2016, Retzlaff returned to his original club Labrador as captain and retired from the team in 2020.

References

External links

Bryce Retzlaff Player Profile, Brisbane Lions

1991 births
Living people
Brisbane Lions players
Australian rules footballers from Queensland
Labrador Australian Football Club players
Box Hill Football Club players